The Much–Holzmann reaction was an early attempt at a serological test for the diagnosis of dementia praecox, an early-twentieth century psychiatric diagnosis superseded by schizophrenia. The originators of this test, Much and Holzmann of Eppendorf, posited that sera from patients with dementia praecox protected red blood cells from cobra venom hemolysis.

References

Serology
Alternative medical diagnostic methods